România TV is a 24-hour Romanian news television with conservative and nationalist orientation, launched on 23 October 2011 by former entrepreneur and politician Sebastian Ghiță. Its slogan is "We give the exact news!".

Initially known as RTV, it was formed when the then-new owner of Realitatea TV, Elan Schwartzenberg, moved the headquarters of the television at Willbrook Platinum. The channel has the former headquarters and some employees of Realitatea TV. On 1 December 2011, RTV changed its name to România TV, following disputes between Ridzone Computers (the channel's operator) and Realitatea Media SA (to which the RTV brand belongs). Later, on 24 August 2013, the channel changed its logo, after the CNA regulatory agency warned the channel to not use the logo variants that alternated on the screen, due to the RTV brand belonging to Realitatea Media SA.

The channel is often fined or subpoenaed by the National Audiovisual Council for the violation of Romanian audiovisual laws.

România TV was pulled out from the Moldovan television network on 20 December 2022.

References

External links
 Official website (in Romanian)

Television stations in Romania
Television channels and stations established in 2011
24-hour television news channels in Romania